Idalmis Bonne Rousseaux (born February 2, 1971) is a retired female sprinter from Cuba.

Career
She claimed a gold medal at the 1995 Pan American Games in Mar del Plata, Argentina.

Bonne, who was born in Guantánamo, competed in three consecutive Summer Olympics for her native country, starting in 1992.

Bonne gave birth to a daughter, Daisurami Bonne, at the age of seventeen. Her daughter also became a sprint athlete and won a gold medal in the relay at the 2011 Pan American Games.

International competitions

References
Picture of Idalmis Bonne

External links

1971 births
Living people
Cuban female sprinters
Athletes (track and field) at the 1991 Pan American Games
Athletes (track and field) at the 1995 Pan American Games
Athletes (track and field) at the 1999 Pan American Games
Athletes (track and field) at the 1992 Summer Olympics
Athletes (track and field) at the 1996 Summer Olympics
Athletes (track and field) at the 2000 Summer Olympics
Olympic athletes of Cuba
Sportspeople from Guantánamo
Pan American Games gold medalists for Cuba
Pan American Games silver medalists for Cuba
Pan American Games medalists in athletics (track and field)
Universiade medalists in athletics (track and field)
Goodwill Games medalists in athletics
Universiade silver medalists for Cuba
Universiade bronze medalists for Cuba
Competitors at the 1991 Summer Universiade
Medalists at the 1993 Summer Universiade
Medalists at the 1997 Summer Universiade
Competitors at the 1994 Goodwill Games
Medalists at the 1991 Pan American Games
Medalists at the 1995 Pan American Games
Medalists at the 1999 Pan American Games
Central American and Caribbean Games medalists in athletics
Olympic female sprinters
20th-century Cuban women
20th-century Cuban people